The Flight into Marriage is a 1922 German silent film directed by Artur Retzbach and starring Gunnar Tolnæs, Carola Toelle and Albert Steinrück.

The film's sets were designed by the art director Gustav A. Knauer.

Cast
 Gunnar Tolnæs as Graf
 Carola Toelle as Miß
 Albert Steinrück as Onkel
 Fritz Schulz as Sohn
 Stella Arbenina as Witwe
 Paul Biensfeldt as Pfarrer
 Wilhelm Diegelmann as Kutscher
 Josefine Dora as Wirtin
 Vera Hall as Frau des Malers
 Leonhard Haskel as Wirt
 Hans Junkermann as Agent
 Rudolf Klein-Rhoden as Antiquar
 Paul Otto as Arzt
 Albert Paulig as Zuschneider
 Karl Victor Plagge as Hotelportier
 Artur Retzbach as Maler

References

Bibliography
 Alfred Krautz. International directory of cinematographers, set- and costume designers in film, Volume 4. Saur, 1984.

External links

1922 films
Films of the Weimar Republic
German silent feature films
Films directed by Artur Retzbach
German black-and-white films
1920s German films